John Howley (30 December 1931 – 25 May 2020) is an Australian painter whose core work is related to the Fantastic Art genre.

Life 

Howley was born in Melbourne and studied at the National Gallery School of Art in Melbourne (1949–54) under Murray Griffin. In 1954 and again in 1955 he exhibited with Group Four, and in 1956 at Brummels Gallery, which established his reputation as an avant-garde artist. In 1962 he left Australia for England and spent 3 years traveling in Europe and North Africa painting and playing improvised music. From 1965 to 1967 he lived for two years in Tel Aviv, Israel where he had 5 exhibitions. In 1967 Howley returned to Melbourne and started to exhibit at Georges Mora’s Tolarno Gallery. In 1980 he established with his Israeli curator wife The Acland Street Art Gallery that continued to exhibit Howley along with several other artists until 1989. The next year he moved to Williamstown, Melbourne dedicating himself to his painting and his involvement in improvised music. The artist now lives in countryside Victoria, Australia.

Howley painted 80 portraits and 2 commissioned murals Tullamarine Airport, Melbourne and Royal Children's Hospital, Melbourne, (the latter mural with two other artists) and has exhibited in Germany, England, Israel, USA and Australia.

Artistic development 

In his student years John Howley’s study of Renaissance masters was the first major influence in his work. Other influences from that time include  German Expressionism and the Australian Social Realism movement. Howley's formal studies and draftsmanship  enabled him to explore a variety of different expressive modes. His oeuvre is characterised by a constant search for new ways to comment on  contemporary civilisation – mainly the transition into a technologically controlled society. His paintings create alternative and fantastic realities.

Music
As well as a painter, Howley was also pianist and vocalist for the Howley, Calvert, George trio - an improvisational jazz trio, (1994-2007) including Robert Calvert on saxophone, and Robert George on drums.

Bibliography 

1968	McCulloch, Alan. Encyclopaedia of Australian Art, Melbourne : Hutchinson
1970	Bonython, Kym. Modern Australian Painting 1960–1970, Adelaide : Rigby
1971	Smith, Bernard. Australian Painting 1870–1970, Oxford
1971	Olsen, John. Review, Art in Australia, Vol. 8, No. 4
1975	Millar, Ronald. Civilized magic, Melbourne : Sorrett
1979	Germaine, Max. Artists and Galleries of  Australia and New Zealand,  Landsdowne
1980	Bonython, Kym. Modern Australian Painting, 1950–1975, Adelaide : Rigby
1981	Art & Artists of Australia, Macmillan Australia
1982	The Seventies : Australian paintings and tapestries from the collection of National Australia Bank, National Bank of Australasia
1983     Bonython, Kym. Modern Australian Painting, 1975–1980, Adelaide : Rigby
1988	The 1989 Australian Art Diary,  Melbourne : Prendergast Publishers
1994	Drury, Neville. New Art Eight, Sydney : Craftsman House
1995	Heathcote, Christopher. A Quiet Revolution, Melbourne : Text Publishing
1998	Swingtime, Lawrence Wilson Art Gallery catalogue, Perth
1999	We Are Australian, Australian Multicultural Foundation

Paintings

References

External links 
http://johnhowley.com
https://web.archive.org/web/20090912150835/http://pennyschoolgallery.com.au/ArtistHowley.htm
http://www.moran.com.au/art/1996/howley.html
http://www.latrobe.edu.au/bendigonews/mediareleases/2008/080827.html
http://www.latrobe.edu.au/vacentre/assets/downloads/archive/John_Howley_archive.pdf
https://web.archive.org/web/20100518180344/http://www.brightspace.com.au/exhibitions/2009/jh/index.htm
Short documentary produced by Bill Edmonds Productions
 http://au.blurb.com/b/4315651-john-howley-art-life
 

Australian painters
1931 births
2020 deaths
20th-century Australian artists
Artists from Melbourne
National Gallery of Victoria Art School alumni